Zhang Deying (born July 1, 1953) also Chang Te-ying, is a former international table tennis player from China.

Table tennis career
From 1977 to 1981 she won several medals in singles, doubles, and team events in the Asian Table Tennis Championships and in the World Table Tennis Championships.

Her nine World Championship medals included five gold medals; three in the team and two in the doubles with Zhang Li and Cao Yanhua.

She was inducted into the ITTF Hall of Fame in 2010.

See also
 List of table tennis players
 ITTF Hall of Fame
 List of table tennis players
 List of World Table Tennis Championships medalists

References

External links
 The ITTF Hall of Fame

Year of birth missing (living people)
Living people
Chinese female table tennis players
Asian Games medalists in table tennis
Table tennis players at the 1978 Asian Games
Table tennis players from Shanghai
Medalists at the 1978 Asian Games
Asian Games gold medalists for China
Asian Games silver medalists for China